Raphitoma atropurpurea is a species of sea snail, a marine gastropod mollusk in the family Raphitomidae.

Description

The monochrome dark brown shell has a somewhat elongated, fusiform shape. The spire is long but not very acuminate. The shell contains 10 convex whorls, separated by a rather impressed suture. The body whorl is rounded and is attenuated progressively downwards. The whorls show narrow, close, prominent ribs intersected by decurrent, narrow, prominent, regular and continual striae, forming a regular reticulation.

Distribution
This marine species occurs in the Mediterranean Sea off Southern France and Corsica.

References

 Pusateri F., Giannuzzi Savelli R., Bartolini S. & Oliverio M. (2017). A revision of the Mediterranean Raphitomidae (Neogastropoda, Conoidea) 4: The species of the group of Raphitoma purpurea (Montagu, 1803) with the description of a new species. Bollettino Malacologico. 53(2): 161-183.

External links
 
 Gastropods.com: Raphitoma (Raphitoma) atropurpurea
 Biolib.cz: Raphitoma atropurpurea

atropurpurea
Gastropods described in 1900